XHEBC-FM is a radio station in Ensenada, Baja California, Mexico. Broadcasting on 97.9 FM.

History

XEEBC-AM received its concession on November 11, 1994, though it had signed on in September. It broadcast on 730 kHz with 1,000 watts day and 250 watts night; its concession was originally held by Radiorama subsidiary Radio Vinculación, S.A. Despite being originally owned by Radiorama, Radiorama affiliates have not owned the station for its entire history; instead, it was bought by Grupo ACIR and resold to Radiorama in the late 2000s.

XEEBC migrated to FM in 2011 as XHEBC-FM 97.9. The AM transmitter went off the air in 2016.

On June 1, 2021, Radio Resultados gained control of XHEPF-FM 89.1 and moved the Fiesta Mexicana format to that frequency. Arroba FM, the company's pop format, then launched on XHEBC-FM. In May 2022  
XHEBC changed from Arroba FM to began as announced in format.

The last brands that the station had are Fiesta Mexicana, @FM (Arroba FM) and Play FM.

References

Radio stations in Ensenada, Baja California
Regional Mexican radio stations
Spanish-language radio stations
Radio stations established in 1994
1994 establishments in Mexico